BS Fabrications was an engineering company specialising in fabrications for Formula One teams founded by Bob Sparshott, a former engineer at Lotus who had worked with Jim Clark and Graham Hill, and John 'Ace' Woodington in Luton in 1972.  The company also ran a number of private F1 cars for customers in Grand Prix racing between 1972 and 1978.

In 1972 the company ran American Brett Lunger in a March F2. They first entered F1 in 1972 under the name of Space Racing when they built a hybrid F1/F2 March for Mike Beuttler using a Formula 2 monocoque with a F1 engine.  They returned under the B&S Fabrications name in 1976, with a Surtees for Henri Pescarolo. The team managed a best finish on the season of 9th at the 1976 Austrian Grand Prix. In the 1977 Formula One World Championship season the team briefly ran a March and then a new McLaren M23 for Lunger. The team matched its best finish to date, with a 9th place at the 1977 Dutch Grand Prix.

The team began the 1978 campaign with the pairing of its reliable McLaren M23 and Lunger, who was returning for his second season driving for the team. After just 4 Grands Prix the switch to the new M26, which had been purchased in the off-season and tested by  Lunger  was made. Subsequently Lunger posted the 3 best performances of his Formula One career, a 7th-place finish in the Belgian Grand Prix and an 8th at both the British and Austrian Grands Prix. With Lunger having some success in the McLaren M26, the team placed Brazilian rookie, and future 3-time Formula One World Champion Nelson Piquet in its M23 for its final 3 Grands Prix of the season. Piquet was able to post a best finish of 9th in the Italian Grand Prix.

The team never completed a full season, having run all but 2 Grands Prix in 1978. It also never scored a Formula One Championship point, coming closest with Lunger at the 1978 Belgian Grand Prix where they finished 7th, just one spot out of the points.

In 1980, the factory was involved in the building of the Toleman TG280.

The team also ran in F2 and F3000, under the name BS Automotive, providing Christian Danner with his F3000 championship win in 1985.

Sparshott still operates an engineering company associated with motorsport.

Complete Formula One World Championship results
(key)

References
 Autosport 16 May 1974 pp29–31

External links
 Team stats
 Bob Sparshott's company, SPARTEC Industries Limited

Formula One entrants
British auto racing teams
Auto racing teams established in 1976
Auto racing teams disestablished in 1978
International Formula 3000 teams
British Touring Car Championship teams